Issigbach is a river of Bavaria, Germany. It passes through Issigau, and flows into the Selbitz near Lichtenberg.

See also
List of rivers of Bavaria

References

Rivers of Bavaria
Hof (district)
Rivers of Germany